Afiamalu is a place on Upolu Island, Samoa. The village, which is part of the greater Apia area, had a population of 183 in 2016.

References

Populated places in Samoa